Damietta University was founded in 2012 in Damietta city in Egypt (Arabic: دمياط Dumyāṭ). The Faculty of Education opened for the academic year 1976-77, the Faculty of Science and the Faculty of Commerce in 1985-86, The Faculty of Specific Education, in 1990-91, The Faculty of Applied Arts in 2004-05 then faculties of Agriculture, Arts and Physical Education in 2006-07.

In July 2012, Presidential Decree No. 19 of 2012 establishing Damietta University in New Damietta was issued.

External links 
 Damietta University
 Damietta University On FaceBook

Universities in Egypt
Damietta